Korthalsella salicornioides or dwarf mistletoe is an endemic parasitic plant in New Zealand.

Description
Korthalsella salicornicoides is named after the succulent coastal plant Salicornia, because it has succulent stems. These appear as a dense mass of small fleshy leafless twigs, up to 10 cm long, usually growing on the host plants manuka (Leptospermum scoparium) and kanuka (Kunzea ericoides). It is reddish-yellow to green with tiny flowers and small yellow fruits from October to May. It is similar to the other two species of New Zealand leafless mistletoe in the genus Korthalsella, but has denser stems arising at a narrower angle.

Conservation
This species is scattered across forests and scrublands in New Zealand, only abundant in small local patches. In some areas it is threatened by felling of Leptospermum and Kunzea for firewood, farming, or exotic forestry. It is classed as At Risk: Naturally Uncommon by the Department of Conservation.

References

Santalaceae
salicornioides
Endemic flora of New Zealand